The 2012–13 FIU Panthers men's basketball team represented Florida International University during the 2012–13 NCAA Division I men's basketball season. The Panthers, led by first year head coach Richard Pitino, played their home games at U.S. Century Bank Arena, and were members of the East Division of the Sun Belt Conference. They finished the season 18–14, 11–9 in Sun Belt play to finish in third place in the East Division. They advanced to the championship game of the Sun Belt tournament where they lost to WKU. Despite the 18 wins, they did not participate in a post season tournament.

This was the Panthers finals season as a member of the Sun Belt. In July, 2013, they joined Conference USA.

Roster

Schedule

|-
!colspan=9| Regular season

|-
!colspan=9| 2013 Sun Belt tournament

References

FIU Panthers men's basketball seasons
Florida International
FIU Panthers men's b
FIU Panthers men's b